National Highway 361, commonly called NH 361, is a national highway in India that runs entirely within the state of Maharashtra. Its western terminal is in Tuljapur near the intersection of NH 52 and the eastern terminal is in Butibori near Nagpur at the intersection of NH 44. The total length of the highway NH-361 is 548 km. It is a spur road of National Highway 61.

The highway passes through the Western Ghats (Sahyadri mountains) and is an important arterial road connecting the Konkan region with Western Maharashtra, Marathwada and Vidharbha regions in the state of Maharashtra.

In 2009, NHAI has announced the extension of existing NH 52 to Nagpur via Ausa-Latur-Nanded-Yavatmal-Wardha and connect it to the NH 61 at Ardhapur near Nanded.

Route 
The most important cities on this highway are: Tuljapur, Ausa, Latur, Chakur, Ahmedpur, Loha, Nanded, Umarkhed,Mahagaon,Arni, Yavatmal, Wardha, Buti Bori near Nagpur.

Junction list

  Terminal near Tuljapur 
 near Latur , Ashtamod.
 near Latur , Ausa
 near Latur
 near Ahmedpur
 near Nanded
 near Nanded
 near Ardhapur
 near Waranga Phata
 near Dhanoda
 near Kalamb
 near Pavnar
  Terminal near Butibori, Nagpur

Project development 
The entire NH 361 highway has been included in the national highway mega projects for upgradation to 4-lane. Out of this, the work for 4 planning of Nagpur-Wardha stretch of 76.4 km has been initiated by Maharashtra government at a cost of INR 145 crores (INR 1.45 Billion).The Highway has been converted into 4 lane from Mahagaon to Wardha which is 216 km long.

See also
 List of National Highways in India
 List of National Highways in India by state
 National Highways Development Project

References

External links
 NH 361 on OpenStreetMap
 Google map

National highways in India
361
Latur
Latur district